This is a bibliography of works on the Provinces and territories of Canada.

Provinces and territories

Alberta

British Columbia

Manitoba
 Friesen, Gerald; Potyondi, Barry. A Guide to the Study of Manitoba Local History. Winnipeg: University of Manitoba Press; 1981
 Hébert, Raymond M. Manitoba's French-Language Crisis: A Cautionary Tale. Montreal: McGill-Queen's University Press; 2004

New Brunswick

  McNutt, W.S.  New Brunswick: A history: 1784-1867 MacMillan, 1963 (still the standard history). 496 pp.
  MacFarlane, William G.  New Brunswick Bibliography: The books and writers of the province. Saint John, 1895.

Newfoundland and Labrador

Nova Scotia

 
 
 
 
John G. Reid. The 'Conquest' of Acadia, 1710: Imperial, Colonial, an Aboriginal Constructions University of Toronto Press. 2004

Ontario

 
 Craig, Gerald M Upper Canada: the formative years 1784-1841 McClelland and Stewart, 1963, the standard history online edition
 Craven, Paul, ed. Labouring Lives: Work and Workers in Nineteenth-Century Ontario (University of Toronto Press, 1995)
 Dunham, Eileen Political unrest in Upper Canada 1815-1836 McClelland and Stewart, 1963.
 Errington, Jane The Lion, the Eagle, and Upper Canada: A Developing Colonial Ideology McGill-Queen's University Press, 1987.
 Drummond, Ian M. Progress Without Planning: The Economic History of Ontario from Confederation to the Second World War (1987) 
 
 Schull, Joseph. Ontario since 1867 (1978) 400pp; general survey emphasizing politics
 Whitcomb, Dr. Ed. A Short History of Ontario. (Ottawa. From Sea To Sea Enterprises, 2006) . 79 pp.
 , general survey emphasizing politics

Prince Edward Island
 Whitcomb, Dr. Ed. A Short History of Prince Edward Island Ottawa. From Sea To Sea Enterprises, 2010. . 56 pp.

Quebec

Saskatchewan

Bennett, John W. and Kohl, Seena B.  Settling the Canadian-American West, 1890-1915. University of Nebraska Press, 1995. 311 pp.
Lipset, Seymour M. Agrarian Socialism: The Cooperative Commonwealth Federation in Saskatchewan: A Study in Political Sociology. University of California Press, 1950.

Northwest Territories
 
 
 Ecosystem Classification Group, and Northwest Territories. Ecological Regions of the Northwest Territories Taiga Plains.

Nunavut
 Alia, Valerie. (2007) Names and Nunavut Culture and Identity in Arctic Canada. New York: Berghahn Books. 
 Henderson, Ailsa. (2007) Nunavut: Rethinking Political Culture. Vancouver: University of British Columbia Press. 
 
 Kulchyski, Peter Keith. (2005) Like the Sound of a Drum: Aboriginal Cultural Politics in Denendeh and Nunavut. Winnipeg: University of Manitoba Press.

Yukon

History by region

Atlantic

 Beck, J. Murray.  The Government of Nova Scotia (1957), a standard history
 Beck, J. Murray. Politics of Nova Scotia. vol 2: 1896-1988. (1985) 438 pp
 Cadigan, Sean T. Newfoundland and Labrador: A History U. of Toronto Press, 2009. Standard scholarly history
 Choyce, Lesley.  Nova Scotia: Shaped by the Sea. A Living History. (1996). 305 pp.
 Faragher, John Mack. A Great and Noble Scheme: The Tragic Story of the Expulsion of the French Acadians from Their American Homeland(2005), 562 p.
 Fay, C. R.; Life and Labour in Newfoundland University of Toronto Press, 1956
 Gwyn, Julian. Excessive Expectations: Maritime Commerce and the Economic Development of Nova Scotia, 1740-1870(1998) 291 pp.
 Harris, Leslie. Newfoundland and Labrador: A Brief History (1968)
 MacKay; R. A. Newfoundland; Economic, Diplomatic, and Strategic Studies Oxford University Press, (1946)
 McGahan, E., Ritcey, J., MacLeod, J., & Pigot, F. (1996). Recent Publications Relating to the History of the Atlantic Region. Acadiensis, 26(1), 102-135. 
 Rowe, Frederick. History of Newfoundland and Labrador (1980).
 Smallwood, Joseph, ed. The Encyclopedia of Newfoundland and Labrador (2nd ed. 1984), 2 vol.; also cd-rom edition
 Whitelaw, William Menzies; The Maritimes and Canada before Confederation (1934) online

Prairies and BC

 Archer, John H. Saskatchewan: A History. Saskatoon: Western Producer Prairie Books, 1980. 422 pp.
 Barman, Jean. The West Beyond the West: A History of British Columbia U. of Toronto Press, 1991. 430pp
 Barnhart, Gordon L., ed. Saskatchewan Premiers of the Twentieth Century. Regina: Canadian Plains Research Center, 2004. 418 pp.
 Bocking, D. H., ed. Pages from the Past: Essays on Saskatchewan History. Saskatoon: Western Producer Prairie Books, 1979. 299 pp.
 Boswell, Randy. Province with a Heart: Celebrating 100 Years in Saskatchewan (2005) 224pp, popular history excerpts and text search
 Encyclopedia of Saskatchewan (2006) from U. of Regina Canadian Plains Research Center, (2005); 1071pp in print edition; article by experts on a very wide range of topics
 Francis, Daniel, ed. Encyclopedia of British Columbia. Madeira Park, B.C.: Harbour, 2000. 806 pp.
 Friesen, Gerald. The Canadian Prairies: A History (2nd ed. 1987)
 Griffin, Harold. Radical Roots: The Shaping of British Columbia. Vancouver: Commonwealth Fund, 1999.
 Heritage Community Foundation. Alberta Online Encyclopedia, online 2009, a short encyclopedia
 Johnston, Hugh, ed. The Pacific Province: A History of British Columbia. (Douglas & McIntyre, 1996). 352 pp.
 Loewen, Royden. "On the Margin or in the Lead: Canadian Prairie Historiography," Agricultural History 73, no. 1 (Winter 1999): 27-45. in JSTOR
 MacGregor, James A. A History of Alberta. Edmonton, Alta.: Hurtig, 1972. 335 pp.
 McGillivray, Brett. Geography of British Columbia: People and Landscapes in Transition (U. of British Columbia Press, 2000). 235pp
 Ormsby, Margaret A. British Columbia: A History (Macmillan, 1958)  online edition
 Palmer, Howard. Alberta: A New History (1999), standard survey by leading historian
 Pitsula, James M. "Disparate Duo" Beaver 2005 85(4): 14-24, a comparison of Saskatchewan with Alberta, Fulltext in EBSCO
 Porter, Jene M., ed.  Perspectives of Saskatchewan (University of Manitoba Press, 2009.) Pp. 377, 18 essays by scholars in several disciplines
 Richards, J. Howard and K.I. Fung, eds. Atlas of Saskatchewan (1969)
 Waiser, Bill. Saskatchewan: A New History (2005), 563 pp. a major scholarly survey
 Wardhaugh, Robert A., ed. Toward Defining the Prairies: Region, Culture, and History. (2001). 234 pp.
 Woodcock, George. British Columbia: A History of the Province. Vancouver: Douglas & McIntyre, 1990. 288 pp.

Primary sources
 Owram, Douglas R., ed. The Formation of Alberta: A Documentary History. Calgary: Hist. Soc. of Alberta, 1979. 403 pp. primary sources

See also

Bibliography of Canada
Bibliography of Canadian history
Bibliography of Canadian military history
Canadian provincial and territorial name etymologies
List of Canada-related topics by provinces and territories
List of Canadian provinces and territories by gross domestic product
Population of Canada by province and territory
Territorial evolution of Canada

External links
Canadiana: The National Bibliography of Canada - Library and Archives Canada

Provinces and territories of Canada
Provinces